A list of films produced in France in 2012.

Notes

External links
 2012 in France
 2012 in French television
 French films of 2012 at the Internet Movie Database
French films of 2012 at Cinema-francais.fr
 List of 2012 box office number-one films in France

French
2012
Films